The Response Boat – Medium (RB-M) is a  utility boat used by the United States Coast Guard. It is a replacement for the Coast Guard's retired fleet of  utility boats (UTB), which had been in use by the Coast Guard since the 1970s. On June 21, 2006 the USCG awarded the RB-M contract to Marinette Marine of Marinette, Wisconsin and Kvichak Marine Industries of Seattle, Washington. The RB-M was designed by Camarc Design in the UK. Between June of 2006 and March of 2015 Marinette, in Green Bay Wisconsin and Kvichak in Kent, Washington partnered to build and deliver 174 RB-Ms to the USCG. Kvichak developed and delivered several police boat variants to several cities including Seattle and New York. 

In the summer of 2017, the Canadian Coast Guard purchased a used 45 RBM from the United States Coast Guard. It is based in Vancouver British Columbia under the name CCGS Laredo Sound.

According to the US Coast Guard, "While primarily a search and rescue asset when the 41' UTB was first fielded, the evolution of missions has increased the requirement to perform many missions including recreational boating safety, marine environmental protection, enforcement of laws and treaties, ports, waterways, and coastal security, and defense operations, including those traditional missions associated with Homeland Security."

On March 17, 2015, the U.S. Coast Guard received the 174th and final RB-M into service.

General characteristics
The boat has a deep-V, double chine hull, which provides a balance of performance and stability. The vessel is self-righting if it capsizes in rough seas. Below the pilot house are six compartments:
 Lazarette
Auxiliary machinery compartment
Engine room
Survivors' Compartment
Forepeak
Head

(Sources:)

Electronics
 FLIR navigator thermal imager
 Furuno scalable integrated navigation system
 Furuno radios
 Gentex LVIS digital intercom system
 Taiyo TD-L1550A VHF Direction Finder
 Motorola 5000 digital mobile radio
 Mount for KY-99 makes RB-M ready for secure communications
 L3 Communications automatic identification system

Hull numbering
In keeping with standard USCG practice, boats of this size have hull numbers and are not named. This type of boat has a hull number beginning with the length of the boat (45′) and then a sequential number. In the case of the RB-M boats, the hull numbers begin with 601. Thus the first boat will be RB-M 45601.

Boats

Sources:

Media

RB-M 45771 at Station Destin, Florida was featured at Smarter Every Day channel

See also

Equipment of the United States Coast Guard

References

External links

Boats of the United States Coast Guard
Equipment of the United States Coast Guard